Marie Gnahoré (born 9 November 1976) is an Ivorian sprinter. She competed in the women's 4 × 100 metres relay at the 2000 Summer Olympics.

References

External links
 

1976 births
Living people
Athletes (track and field) at the 2000 Summer Olympics
Ivorian female sprinters
Olympic athletes of Ivory Coast
Place of birth missing (living people)
Olympic female sprinters